Porte de la Chapelle is a station on line 12 of the Paris Métro in the districts of La Chapelle and Goutte d'Or and the 18th arrondissement.

The station opened on 23 August 1916 as part of the extension of the Nord-Sud company's line A from Jules Joffrin. On 27 March 1931 line A became line 12 of the Métro. Porte de la Chapelle was the terminus of line 12 until 18 December 2012, when an extension opened to Front Populaire.

The station is named after the Porte de la Chapelle, a gate in the nineteenth century Thiers wall of Paris, on the Rue de la Chapelle, the old Roman road to Calais via Saint-Denis, now Route nationale 1. It was named after a village that was annexed by Paris in 1860 and was named after a chapel to Saint Genevieve built in the 6th century.

The station is featured in "Crossroads", an episode of the American HBO series "Band of Brothers".

Work is under way to extend the line into the commune of Aubervilliers, initially to Front Populaire, which opened in 2012. It is proposed to extend it further north through several stations to La Courneuve – Aubervilliers RER line B station or La Courneuve 6 Routes Tramway line 1 station.

An interchange with Paris tramway Line 3b opened on 15 December 2012. The tramway terminates at Porte de la Chapelle.

Station layout

Gallery

References

Paris Métro stations in the 18th arrondissement of Paris
Railway stations in France opened in 1916